Viribestus is a monotypic genus of Papuan jumping spiders containing the single species, Viribestus suyanensis. It was first described by J. X. Zhang & Wayne Paul Maddison in 2012, and is found in Papua New Guinea.

References

Monotypic Salticidae genera
Salticidae
Spiders of Asia